Senator Salmon may refer to:

Mary Anne Salmon (born 1939), Arkansas State Senate
Matt Salmon (born 1958), Arizona State Senate

See also
Jesse Salomon (born 1976), Washington State Senate